Fernando Monteiro Torres (14 November 1927 – 4 September 2008) was a Brazilian actor and voice-over artist, as well as a television, film and theater director and producer. Torres' career in Brazilian film, stage and television spanned over five decades. He was best known to international movie audiences for his supporting role as Americo in the 1985 film, Kiss of the Spider Woman, which won several awards.

He was born in Guaçuí, Espírito Santo, Brazil, on November 14, 1927. Torres was married to Academy Award-nominated Brazilian actress Fernanda Montenegro from 1953 until his death. The couple had two children together, film director Cláudio Torres (pt) and actress Fernanda Torres. Torres founded the Teatro dos Sete in 1959.

Fernando Torres died in his home in Rio de Janeiro of pulmonary emphysema on September 4, 2008, at the age of 80.

Filmography

Television
Television actor
 Laços de Família (2000) - Aléssio Lacerda
 Zazá (1997) - Brigadeiro
 Amor com Amor Se Paga (1984) - Tio Romão
 Louco Amor (1983) - Alfredo
 Sétimo Sentido (1982) - Harold Bergman
 Terras do Sem Fim (1981)
 Baila Comigo (1981) - Plínio Miranda
 Simplesmente Maria (1970)
 A Gordinha (1970)
 Dez Vidas (1969) - Cláudio Manoel da Costa
 Vitória (1964)
 Pouco Amor Não É Amor (1963)
 A Morte Sem Espelho (1963)

Television director
 Minha Doce Namorada (1971)
 Ana (1968)
 Paixão de Outono (1965)
 Coração (1964)
 O Desconhecido (1964)
 Pouco Amor Não É Amor (1963)
 A Morte Sem Espelho (1963)

Film actor 
Redentor (2004)
Ação Entre Amigos (1998)
A Ostra e o Vento (1997) 
Veja Esta Canção (1994) 
Kiss of the Spider Woman (O Beijo da Mulher Aranha) (1985)
Inocência (1983)
Tudo Bem (1978) 
Marília e Marina (1976)
O Descarte (1973)
Eu Transo...Ela Transa (1972)
Os Inconfidentes (1972)
Matei Por Amor (1971)
A Penúltima Donzela (1969)
Golias Contra o Homem das Bolinhas (1969)
Em Busca do Tesouro (1967)
Jerry - A grande parada (1967)
Engraçadinha Depois dos Trinta (1966)
Star Without Light (1953)
A Mulher de Longe (1949)

References

External links 
 
 The International News: Brazilian actor Fernando Torres dies aged 80

1927 births
2008 deaths
Brazilian male voice actors
Brazilian male television actors
Brazilian male film actors
Brazilian male stage actors
Brazilian theatre directors
Brazilian television directors
People from Espírito Santo
Male actors from Rio de Janeiro (city)
Deaths from emphysema